

Function 
Nkx 2.9 is a transcription factor responsible for the formation of the branchial and visceral motor neuron subtypes of cranial motor nerves in vertebrates. Nkx 2.9 works together with another transcription factor, Nkx 2.2, to direct neural progenitor cells to their cell fate.

Gene defects 
Cell lineage analysis of Nkx 2.9 and Nkx 2.2 double knockout (deficient) mouse embryos shows that cranial nerve alterations are a result of changes in neuronal progenitor cell fate. The trigeminal nerve is not affected in the double knockout mouse embryos, indicating that cell fate alteration is limited to the caudal hindbrain; that Nkx 2.9 and Nkx 2.2 proteins do not play a role in branchial or visceral motor neuron development in the portion of the hindbrain superior to neuromere 4.

Disturbance of Nkx 2.9 and Nkx 2.2 in mouse embryos results in the total loss of the spinal accessory and vagal motor nerves, and a partial loss of the glossopharyngeal and facial motor nerves. However, the somatic hypoglossal and abducens motor nerves are not disrupted.

References

Transcription factors
Developmental neuroscience